English Woods is a neighborhood in Cincinnati, Ohio, United States.

In 2005, the housing projects which occupied a large portion of the area of English Woods were largely demolished after renovation was calculated to be prohibitively expensive while local HUD, city leaders, and residents failed to come up with a workable redevelopment plan. The population was 361 at the 2020 census.

Demographics

Source - City of Cincinnati Statistical Database

References

Neighborhoods in Cincinnati